Halab, also Romanized as Ḩalab and Khalab) is a city in and the capital of Halab District of Ijrud County, Zanjan province, Iran. At the 2006 census, its population was 829 in 218 households. The following census in 2011 counted 1,089 people in 250 households. The latest census in 2016 showed a population of 956 people in 259 households.

References 

Ijrud County

Cities in Zanjan Province

Populated places in Zanjan Province

Populated places in Ijrud County